Peycho Deliminkov  (Bulgarian: Пейчо Делиминков) (born 11 June 1984 in Burgas) is a Bulgarian football defender.

External links
 footmercato profile

Bulgarian footballers
Association football midfielders
Pietà Hotspurs F.C. players
First Professional Football League (Bulgaria) players
1985 births
Living people